Stephen Fulder (born 1946 in London, England) is the founder and senior teacher of the Israel Insight Society (Tovana), the major organisation in Israel teaching Buddhist meditative practice. He has worked since 1975  in the field of herbal and complementary medicine as an author, consultant and researcher, publishing many books and research papers. His latest book is: "What's Beyond Mindfulness: Waking Up to This Precious Life".

Biography 
Stephen Fulder was educated at University of Oxford and the National Institute of Medical Research, where he was awarded his PhD in Molecular Biology. He was a lecturer at London University. He is the founder and senior teacher of Tovana (the Israel Insight Society), a leading Buddhist practice organisation in Israel, teaching Mindfulness, Vipassana and dharma. He has been practicing meditation since 1975. He has been involved for many years in peace work in the Middle East and was a founder of the Middle Way organisation. He used to work in the field of herbs and alternative medicine about which he has written numerous books.

Tovana (Israel Insight Society) 
Stephen Fulder has established Tovana (the Israel Insight Society) which is a teaching organisation for the practice of attention in everyday life through insight meditation — Vipassana. Tovana is inspired by Buddhist tradition, philosophy and practice as a way of life. Tovana is linked to a looser network of  Western centers and teachers, such as the Insight Meditation Society in the United States and Gaia House in Britain. It holds many residential retreats throughout the year as well as lectures, meetings and weekly  group practices across the country.

Bibliography 
 Ageing and Somatic Mutations in Human Fibroblasts, Ph.D Thesis,  CNAA,  London (1975).
 About Ginseng, Thorsons, Harper Collins, London (1976). 
 The Ginseng Book, Avery  Press, New York (1996). 
 The Book of Ginseng, and other Chinese Herbs for Vitality, Healing Arts Press, Rochester, Vermont, (1993). 
 An End to Ageing?, Thorsons, Harper Collins, London, and Healing  Arts  Press, Rochester, Vermont, (1987). 
 The Handbook of Alternative and Complementary Medicine, Third edition,  Oxford  University Press, Oxford (1996). 
 Garlic, Nature's  Original  Remedy (with John  Blackwood),Healing Arts Press, Rochester, Vermont (1991). 
 The Garlic Book. Avery  Press, New York (1996). 
 How To Survive Medical Treatment, Third edition, C.W. Daniel, Saffron Walden,  Essex (1994). 
 Towards a New Science of Health, (with R. Lafaille, co-editor), Routledge,   London (1993). 
 The Ginger Book: Souvenir Press, London (1994). and Avery  Press, New York, (1996).
 Potentiating Health and the Crisis of Immunity, (with A. Mizrachi, N. Sheinman, co-editors), Plenum, New York, (1996).
 FAQs: All About Garlic Avery Press, New York (1998). 
 FAQs: All About Ginseng, Avery Press, New York (1998). 
 User's Guide to Garlic, Basic Health Publications, Bergen, New Jersey (2005) 
 What's Beyond Mindfulness: Waking Up to This Precious Life Watkins (2019)

See also 
 Buddhism in The Middle East
 Christopher Titmuss
 Joseph Goldstein

References

External links 
 Tovana (The Israel Insight Society): http://tovana.org.il/
 Stephen Fulder's Website in English: www.stephenfulder.com
 Stephen Fulder's Website in Hebrew: www.heb.stephenfulder.com
 Stephen Fulder's Dharma Talks on Dharma Seed: http://imsb.dharmaseed.org/teacher/589/
 Stephen Fulder's article on Tricycle: Do We Really "Have No Choice"?
 Mashiv Nefesh - Spiritual Center in Klil (in Hebrew): https://mnclil.com/

British health and wellness writers
British Buddhists
Herbalists
Living people
1946 births